Stewart Crossing is a settlement in  Yukon, Canada located on the Stewart River. A Yukon government highway maintenance camp and a highway lodge are the most prominent facilities at Stewart Crossing. The settlement is named for where the Klondike Highway (or Mayo Road, as it was then known), crossed the Stewart River by means of a ferry from 1950 until completion of a bridge in the mid-1950s.

Geography

Climate

Demographics 

References

Northern Tutchone
Settlements in Yukon